The 2004 Rally Catalunya (formally the 40. Rallye Catalunya - Costa Brava) was the fifteenth round of the 2004 World Rally Championship season. The race was held over three days between 29 October and 31 October 2004, and was based in Lloret de Mar, Spain. Ford's Markko Märtin won the race, his 5th and final win in the World Rally Championship.

Background

Entry list

Itinerary
All dates and times are CEST (UTC+2) from 29 to 30 October 2004 and CET (UTC+1) on 31 October 2004.

Results

Overall

World Rally Cars

Classification

Special stages

Championship standings
Bold text indicates 2004 World Champions.

Junior World Rally Championship

Classification

Special stages

Championship standings
Bold text indicates 2004 World Champions.

References

External links 
 Official website of the World Rally Championship

Rally Catalunya
Rally Catalunya